The Night of the Shooting Stars (UK: The Night of San Lorenzo) is a 1982 Italian fantasy war drama film directed by Paolo Taviani and Vittorio Taviani. It was written by Giuliani G. De Negri, Paolo Taviani, Tonino Guerra, and Vittorio Taviani. It was entered into the 1982 Cannes Film Festival where it won the Jury Special Grand Prix. The film was selected by Italy as its entry for the Best Foreign Language Film at the 55th Academy Awards, but was not accepted as a nominee.

Plot
The film opens with a mother telling her sleeping son a story from her childhood. The story recounts how wishes come true when a shooting star occurs. She proceeds to tell the story of the Italian town she once lived in. A man and his pregnant fiancé quickly marry in the church. After their marriage, the family of the bride had a mini celebration. The film follows several inhabitants of an Italian town during the end of World War II. Defeat is certain for the German army, and the front is retreating to Germany, leaving a path of destruction in its wake. The Germans plan to blow up several buildings in the town and have told all the villagers to congregate in the town's church. Approximately half of the town decides to stay and place their trust in the church. The rest of the town dresses in dark clothing to blend in the night. The man joined the retreating group as his wife and her mother stayed in the church. They head out seeking the Americans who were rumored to be nearby, liberating towns as they come to them.

The bishop wants to say mass with the townspeople in the church. He finds only two pieces of bread for communion. One of the townspeople mentions that she has a loaf of bread. The bishop asks her, and the rest of the congregation, to divide up their bread so he can bless it and use it instead of the standard host. While he is performing communion, the Fascists explode a bomb in the church, resulting in panic, people fleeing, and many casualties. One wounded girl is seen being carried outside by her mother. It was the man's wife. The bishop tries to help carry the woman but when he realises that he caused the deaths, he drops her and flees. As the mother continues to carry her, the husband returns from his group to be with his wife, but it is too late to save her.

The man returns to his group and they continue their trek. They pass a field where partisans are harvesting the grain. The partisans share their complaints that they're replacing the grain stolen by the Fascists. The group had learned on the road that the partisans can help transport people safely to a city away from the Fascists. The group helps the partisans harvest grain. During the day, the group must hide from German planes that fly over at midday while they are threshing. Cecilia, who is telling this story, reveals that, at that night, the shooting stars occurred, but the people were so caught up in the pain and fear that they forgot all about it. In the afternoon of the next day, the group is ambushed by Fascists. During the ambush, the majority of the group are killed. Cecilia watches a Fascist kill her grandfather and mother. As the Fascist comes after Cecilia, she repeats a nonsense rhyme that her mother had taught her to say whenever she is afraid. As she says the lines, an ancient warrior appears with a spear and a shield. The warrior throws the spear and pierces the Fascist's stomach. As the Fascist looks up in surprise, a line of ancient warriors appears and throw their spears, killing the Fascist.

The man, Cecilia, and a few other members of the group survive the fight and continue heading to their journey. That night, Galvano, the elderly leader of the group and an older woman from the group share a room, leading them to reveal that they have had feelings for each other since they were young.

The mother tells her sleeping son to remember the lines of the rhyme, then the mother is revealed to be Cecilia, the child in the story.

Cast
 Omero Antonutti - Galvano
 Margarita Lozano - Concetta
 Claudio Bigagli - Corrado
 Miriam Guidelli - Belindia
 Massimo Bonetti - Nicola
 Enrica Maria Modugno - Mara
 Sabina Vannucchi - Rosanna
 Giorgio Naddi - Bishop
 Renata Zamengo - La Scardigli
 Micol Guidelli - Cecilia
 Massimo Sarchielli - Father Marmugi
 Giovanni Guidelli - Marmugi Junior
 Mario Spallino - Bruno
 Paolo Hendel - Dilvo

Reception
The film was given a rapturous review in The New Yorker by the critic Pauline Kael, who wrote, "The Night of the Shooting Stars is so good it's thrilling. This new film encompasses a vision of the world. Comedy, tragedy, vaudeville, melodrama - they're all here, and inseparable...In its feeling and completeness, Shooting Stars may be close to the rank of Jean Renoir's bafflingly beautiful Grande Illusion...unreality doesn't seem divorced from experience (as it does with Fellini) - it's experience made more intense...For the Tavianis, as for Cecilia, the search for the American liberators is the time of their lives. For an American audience, the film stirs warm but tormenting memories of a time when we were beloved and were a hopeful people."

In July 2018, it was selected to be screened in the Venice Classics section at the 75th Venice International Film Festival.

Soundtrack

Richard Wagner, "O Star of Eve" from Tannhäuser

See also
 List of submissions to the 55th Academy Awards for Best Foreign Language Film
 List of Italian submissions for the Academy Award for Best Foreign Language Film

References

External links

 
 
 

1982 films
1982 drama films
1982 fantasy films
Italian war drama films
1980s Italian-language films
Films set in Tuscany
Italian Campaign of World War II films
Films directed by Paolo and Vittorio Taviani
Films with screenplays by Tonino Guerra
Films about fascists
National Society of Film Critics Award for Best Film winners
Films scored by Nicola Piovani
Cannes Grand Prix winners
Italian fantasy films
1980s Italian films